Cockerham Cross railway station, also known as Cockerham Crossing railway station was a halt at a level crossing on a road that crossed Cockerham Moss towards Cockerham in Lancashire, England. It opened with the line in 1870 and closed in 1930.

History 
The station opened on 5 December 1870 by the Garstang and Knot-End Railway. It was situated north of Garstang Road. Passenger services were ceased on 9 March 1872 due to mechanical faults with the train. Repairs were made and the services resumed but they ceased again on 29 March due to more underlying problems. A new engine was purchased and services resumed again on 17 May 1875. An area map from 1892 shows that there was no platform but a map from 1912 showed one and it was described in an article from 1908 but the exact date it was added is unknown. The station was only served on Thursdays and Saturdays. 'Halt' was added to its name in July 1923. Like the other stations on the line, it struggled due to the introduction of the bus services in the 1920s, so it closed on 31 March 1930. The track was lifted a few years after goods 
traffic ceased on the line in 1963.

References

External links 

Disused railway stations in the Borough of Wyre
The Fylde
Railway stations in Great Britain opened in 1870
Railway stations in Great Britain closed in 1872
Railway stations in Great Britain opened in 1875
Railway stations in Great Britain closed in 1930
1870 establishments in England
1930 disestablishments in England